Jaimie Breezy Branch (June 17, 1983 – August 22, 2022) was an American jazz trumpeter and composer.

Biography 
Branch was born in Huntington, New York, on June 17, 1983. She started playing trumpet at age nine. At age 14, she moved to Wilmette, a suburb of Chicago. She attended the New England Conservatory of Music.

After graduating, Branch moved back to Chicago, working as a musician, organizer, and sound engineer on the local music scene, including with Jason Ajemian (on The Art of Dying, 2006), Keefe Jackson's Project Project (on Just Like This, 2007), Tim Daisy's New Fracture Quartet (on 1000 Lights, 2008), Anton Hatwich, and Ken Vandermark. She performed in Chicago and New York with her trio Princess, Princess, with bassist Toby Summerfield and drummer Frank Rosaly, in trios with Tim Daisy and Daniel Levin, Matt Schneider, and Jason Adasiewicz, and with Chris Velkommen and Sam Weinberg. Together with Jason Stein, Jeb Bishop, and Jason Roebke, she founded the band Block and Tackle. She played on five albums between 2006 and 2008.

In 2012 Branch moved to Baltimore, where she worked toward a master's degree in Jazz performance from Towson University. At this time she also founded the record label Pionic Records, which released the music of her group Bomb Shelter. After two years, she dropped out of Towson, and six months later she moved to New York to seek treatment for heroin addiction.

In the spring of 2015 Branch moved to Brooklyn, where she began working with Fred Lonberg-Holm, Mike Pride, Luke Stewart, Jason Nazary, Tcheser Holmes, and many more. In addition, she performed on albums with the independent rock groups Never Enough Hope, Local H and Atlas Moth. As of 2016, she worked in a quartet with Chad Taylor (drums), Jason Ajemian (bass) and Tomeka Reid (cello), as well as with Mike Pride, Shayna Dulberger and Weasel Walter, and with Yoni Kretzmer and Tobey Cederberg. In 2017 she released her debut solo album, Fly or Die, with Tomeka Reid, Jason Ajemian, Chad Taylor, Matt Schneider (guitar), Ben LaMar Gay, and Josh Berman (cornet). Fly or Die was chosen as one of NPR Music's Top 50 Albums of 2017.

Branch cited Don Cherry, Axel Dörner, Booker Little, Miles Davis, and Evan Parker among her musical influences.

Branch died at home in the Red Hook section of Brooklyn on August 22, 2022, at the age of 39.

Discography (in selection)

Albums as bandleader 
 2017: Fly or Die (International Anthem Recording Co.)
 2019: Fly or Die II: Bird Dogs of Paradise (International Anthem Recording Co.)
 2021: FLY or DIE LIVE (International Anthem Recording Co.)

Collaborations 
 Keefe Jacksons Project, with Dave Rempis, Guillermo Gregorio, Anton Hatwich, Jason Stein, James Falzone, Frank Rosaly, Josh Berman, Jeb Bishop, Nick Broste, and Marc Unternährer
 2007:Just Like This (Delmark  Records)
 New Fracture Quartet, with Nate McBride, Tim Daisy, and Dave Miller 
 2008: 1,000 Lights (Multikulti Project)
 Predella Group, with Nate McBride, Fred Lonberg-Holm, Tim Daisy, Jeff Parker, Ken Vandermark, and Jeb Bishop
 2010: Strade D ' Acqua / Roads of Water (Multikulti Project)
 Bullet Hell, with Jakob Kart and Theodore Representerer
 2013: Smart Bombs (Pionic Records)
 Beyond All Things, with Chris Welcome (bandleader) and others
 2018: Live at the Bushwick Series (gaucimusic)
 Anteloper, with Jason Nazary
 2018: Kudu (International Anthem Recording Co.)
 2020: Tour Beats Vol. 1 (International Anthem Recording Co.)
 2022: Pink Dolphins (International Anthem Recording Co.)
 Party Knüllers X Jaimie Branch
 2019: Live at la Casa (Bandcamp, digital only)
 Ig Henneman, Jaimie Branch & Anne La Berge
 2019: Dropping Stuff and Other Folk Songs (Relative Pitch Records)
 An Unruly Manifesto, with James Brandon Lewis (bandleader) and others
 2019: An Unruly Manifesto (Relative Pitch Records)
 2022: Medicine Singers,(Stone Tapes & Joyful Noise Recordings)
 Dave Gisler Trio with Jaimie Branch and David Murray
 2022: See You Out There (Intakt)

References

External links 
 
 
 
 
 Intervju in Jazz Right Now (2016)

1983 births
2022 deaths
21st-century trumpeters
American jazz trumpeters
Jazz musicians from New York (state)
Musicians from Brooklyn
People from Red Hook, Brooklyn
People from Wilmette, Illinois
Jazz musicians from Illinois
21st-century American composers
21st-century American women musicians
American jazz composers
Women jazz composers
American women jazz musicians
Women trumpeters
People from Huntington, New York
New England Conservatory alumni
Deaths from influenza